Aglaia sessilifolia is a tree in the family Meliaceae. The bark is greyish brown or dark brown. The flowers are yellow. The specific epithet  is from the Latin meaning "stalkless leaf". Habitat is limestone hill forests from sea level to  altitude. A. sessilifolia is endemic to Borneo and confined to Malaysia's Sabah state.

References

sessilifolia
Endemic flora of Borneo
Trees of Borneo
Flora of Sabah
Plants described in 2004
Flora of the Borneo lowland rain forests